Ann Dodge (born March 26, 1871) is a Canadian sprint kayaker who competed in the mid-1970s.

Dodge was the first woman from Nova Scotia ever selected to the Canadian Olympic team in sprint kayak. At the 1976 Summer Olympics in Montreal, she finished eighth in the K-2 500 m event. She and partner Sue Holloway were the first Canadian women ever to reach an Olympic final in the sport.

Dodge was named Nova Scotia Athlete of the Year in 1977 and was inducted into the Nova Scotia Sports Hall of Fame in 1994. She earned a bachelor's degree in Physical Education from Acadia University and a master's from the University of New Brunswick.  She is currently a lecturer in kinesiology at Acadia.

References

Sports-reference.com profile

1958 births
Sportspeople from Halifax, Nova Scotia
Nova Scotia Sport Hall of Fame inductees
Canadian female canoeists
Canoeists at the 1976 Summer Olympics
Living people
Olympic canoeists of Canada